Perepechikha is a rural locality (a village) in Yavengskoye Rural Settlement, Vozhegodsky District, Vologda Oblast, Russia. The population was 17 as of 2002.

Geography 
Perepechikha is located 18 km northeast of Vozhega (the district's administrative centre) by road. Maryinskaya is the nearest rural locality.

References 

Rural localities in Vozhegodsky District